The al-Nasser Salah al-Deen Brigades is the military wing of the Popular Resistance Committees, a set of various Palestinian militant organizations that operate in the Gaza Strip.

History 
These brigades participated in Operation Dispersive Illusion, which resulted in the capture of the Israeli soldier Gilad Shalit. The group is also known for blowing up a Merkava tank, the main battle tank of the Israel Defense Forces.

The brigades fought during the Gaza War from December 2008 to January 2009.

Imad Hammad, the leader of the Al-Nasser Salah al-Deen Brigades, was killed in an IDF strike in Rafah town on 18 August 2011.

The group also took part in the 2014 Israel–Gaza conflict, and the death of one of its members in an Israeli raid was one of the reasons for the outbreak of Gaza–Israel clashes in November 2018.

References

Palestinian militant groups
Resistance movements
Palestinian terrorism
2001 establishments in the Palestinian territories
Axis of Resistance